Podgorje is a settlement in the Municipality of Apače in northeastern Slovenia.

References

External links 
Podgorje on Geopedia

Populated places in the Municipality of Apače